The Istanbul Armenian Genocide memorial, also known as Huşartsan, was a marble monument that became the first memorial dedicated to the victims of the Armenian genocide. It was erected in 1919 at a site now partly located within today's Gezi Park, near Taksim Square in Istanbul, Ottoman Empire. The monument was located on the premises of the former Pangaltı Armenian Cemetery. In 1922, during the Turkish National Movement, the monument was dismantled and subsequently lost under unknown circumstances.

History

Background
The Armenian Genocide was the Ottoman government's systematic extermination of its minority Armenian subjects from their historic homeland within the territory constituting the present-day Republic of Turkey. The total number of people killed as a result has been estimated at between 1 and 1.5 million . In the aftermath of World War I, with the Ottoman Empire defeated, the Allied forces occupied various parts of the Ottoman Empire; the British seized control of Constantinople and the Bosphorus. During this period, the first commemoration of the Armenian Genocide was organized on 24 April (Rumi calendar: 11 April), the day that marked the beginning of the deportation of Armenian intellectuals. The commemoration, organized by a group of Armenian Genocide survivors, was held in Istanbul in 1919 at the local Holy Trinity Armenian church. Many prominent figures in the Armenian community participated in the commemoration. Following its initial commemoration in 1919, the date became the annual day of remembrance for the Armenian Genocide.

Monument's inauguration
After the first commemoration, plans were implemented to build a monument dedicated to the victims of the genocide. A committee was formed to carry out the project. It was eventually erected in 1919 and was located on the premises of the Pangaltı Armenian Cemetery. The cemetery, which was to be later demolished and confiscated by the Turkish government in the 1930s, was located in today's Gezi Park near the Taksim Square in Istanbul. The monument became the first memorial dedicated to the victims of the Armenian Genocide. 

In 1922, during the resurgence of the Turkish National Movement, the monument was dismantled and subsequently lost under unknown circumstances. According to historian Kevork Pamukçuyan, the base of the monument was last seen in the gardens of the Harbiye Military Barracks (which now houses the Istanbul Military Museum).

Legacy
The monument was featured on the cover of a 1919 book dedicated to the memory of the victims of the genocide written by Teotig, the prominent Armenian writer and publisher.

During the Gezi Park protests, various activists demanded that the memorial be rebuilt. Cengiz Algan, a leading member of a NGO called "Dur De" (Say Stop), expressed his support to having the monument rebuilt by saying:

See also
 Armenians in Turkey
 Armenian Genocide Remembrance Day
 List of Armenian genocide memorials

References

External links
Full online edition of Teotig's Hushartsan April Tasnemegi (in Armenian)

Armenian genocide memorials
Monuments and memorials in Istanbul
1919 sculptures
1919 establishments in the Ottoman Empire
Genocide memorial
Armenian Genocide memorial
Destroyed sculptures
Removed monuments and memorials
Buildings and structures demolished in 1922
1922 disestablishments in the Ottoman Empire